Hated on Mostly is the second studio album by American Southern hip hop sextet Crime Mob from Atlanta. It was released March 20, 2007 via Warner Bros. Records, Crunk Incorporated, and Reprise Records. Production was handled by Detral "Doc Jam" Treadwell, DJ Montay, Lil Jon, and group members Lil' Jay, Cyco Blac and M.I.G., with Crunk Incorporated serving as executive producer. It features guest appearances from Lil Scrappy, Pimp C, Bohagon and Mike Jones. The album debuted at number 31 on the U.S. Billboard 200. Its lead single, "Rock Yo Hips", reached number 30 on the Billboard Hot 100 chart.

Track listing

Personnel

Jonathan "Lil' Jay" Lewis – main artist, songwriter (tracks: 1-3, 5-8, 10-11), producer (tracks: 1, 2, 5, 7, 10), mixing (tracks: 1, 2, 5)
Alphonce "Cyco Blac" Smith – main artist, songwriter (tracks: 2-8, 10-12), producer (tracks: 8, 12)
Jacques "M.I.G." Usher – main artist, songwriter (tracks: 1-2, 4-9, 11-12), producer (track 11)
Brittany "Diamond" Carpentero – main artist, songwriter (tracks: 1-2, 4-13)
Venetia "Princess" Lewis – main artist, songwriter – main artist, songwriter (tracks: 1-2, 4-13)
Chris "Killa C" Henderson – main artist, songwriter (tracks: 1-8, 11-12)
Darryl "Lil Scrappy" Richardson – featured artist (tracks: 5, 8), songwriter (track 8), 
Chad "Pimp C" Butler – featured artist & songwriter (track 8)
Cedric "Bohagon" Leonard – featured artist & songwriter (track 13)
Mike Jones – additional vocals & songwriter (track 6)
Detral "Doc Jam" Treadwell – producer & songwriter (tracks: 3, 6, 9)
Montay "DJ Montay" Humphrey – producer & songwriter (track 4)
Jonathan "Lil Jon" Smith – producer & mixing (track 13), 
Mike Wilson – mixing (tracks: 1, 2, 4, 5, 7), recording (tracks: 1-5, 7, 9, 11)
Chris Carmouche – mixing (tracks: 3, 6, 8-12), recording (track 13)
John Frye – mixing (track 13)
Mike Guidotti – recording (tracks: 6, 12)
Brandon "Tec Beatz" Sewell – recording (tracks: 8, 10)
Jason Fleming – recording (track 8)
Julien Pineda – recording (track 8)
Jamie Newman – assistant mixing (tracks: 1, 2, 4, 5)
Warren Bletcher – assistant mixing (tracks: 3, 6-12)
Aaron Holton – assistant engineering (tracks: 6, 12)
Danny Zook – sample clearance
A. Wright Williams – creative & visual direction
Clay Patrick McBridge – photography
Liza Joseph – A&R

Charts

References

External links

2007 albums
Crime Mob albums
Reprise Records albums
Albums produced by Lil Jon